Gabriel Zucman (born 30 October 1986) is a French economist who is currently an associate professor of public policy and economics at the University of California, Berkeley‘s Goldman School of Public Policy. The author of The Hidden Wealth of Nations: The Scourge of Tax Havens (2015), Zucman is known for his research on tax havens and corporate tax havens.

Zucman's research has found that the leading corporate tax havens are all OECD–compliant, and that tax disputes between high–tax locations and havens are very rare. His papers are some of the most cited papers on research into tax havens. Zucman is also known for his work on the quantification of the financial scale of base erosion and profit shifting (BEPS) tax avoidance techniques employed by multinationals in corporate tax havens, through which he identified Ireland as the world's largest corporate tax haven in 2018. 

In 2018, Zucman was the recipient of the Prize for the Best Young Economist in France, awarded by the Cercle des économistes and Le Monde in recognition of his research on tax evasion and avoidance and their economic consequences.

Early life and education

Zucman was born in Paris in 1986, and is the son of two French doctors. His mother is an immunology researcher while his father treats HIV patients.

In interviews, Zucman describes the "traumatic political event of my youth", as being when Jean-Marie Le Pen reached the final rounds of the 2002 French presidential election, when Zucman was 15. In 2018, Zucman said of that event: "A lot of my political thinking since then has been focused on how we can avoid this disaster from happening again. So far, we’ve failed".

From 2005 to 2010, Zucman attended the École normale supérieure de Cachan, one of France's prestigious Grandes Écoles. Hereafter, he first earned his M.Sc. in economic policy analysis in 2008 and a PhD in economics in 2013, both from the School for Advanced Studies in the Social Sciences (EHESS) and the Paris School of Economics, for which he received the French Economic Association's award for best PhD dissertation in 2014.

Career 
After finishing his studies, Zucman worked for a year as a postdoctoral scholar at the University of California at Berkeley (UC Berkeley) before accepting a position as assistant professor of economics at the London School of Economics (LSE) and the same position at UC Berkeley, being currently on leave from LSE. Moreover, Zucman has worked as Co-Director of the World Wealth and Income Database (WID), a database aiming at the provision of access to extensive data series on the world distribution of income and wealth, since 2015.

Besides his research and teaching activities, Zucman has refereed for several economic journals, including the Quarterly Journal of Economics, the Review of Economic Studies, Econometrica, and the Journal of Political Economy. He also co–founded and acted as editor–in–chief for Regards croisés sur l'économie, a review aimed at exposing the French general public to academic research in economics.

Research

In August 2014 in Capital is Back, Zucman and French economist Thomas Piketty investigate the evolution of aggregate wealth–to–income ratios in the top eight developed economies, reaching back as far as 1700 in the case of the U.S., U.K., Germany, and France, and find that wealth–income ratios have risen from about 200–300% in 1970 to 400–600% in 2010, levels unknown since the 18th and 19th centuries. Most of the change can be explained by the long-run recovery of asset prices, the slowdown of productivity, and population growth. Zucman has co-written several papers with Thomas Piketty.

Much of Zucman's research is on issues of economic inequality and, most importantly, tax havens. In 2015 in his book,The Hidden Wealth of Nations, Zucman uses the systematic anomalies in international investment positions to show that the net foreign asset positions of rich countries are generally underestimated because they don't capture most of the assets held by households in offshore tax havens. Based on his calculations, he finds about 8% of the global financial wealth of households, or $7.6 trillion, to be held in tax havens, three–quarters of which go undeclared.

In 2017–18, Zucman focused on the scale of multinational tax avoidance by base erosion and profit shifting ("BEPS") tools in the largest corporate tax havens. Zucman believes Ireland, recognised as a major corporate tax haven, is still materially underestimated by Orbis–database studies due to technical factors (even though these studies rank Ireland as the 5th largest global corporate Conduit OFC). Research published by Zucman, Tørsløv and Wier in June 2018, showed that Ireland is the largest corporate tax haven in the world, even larger than the entire Caribbean corporate tax haven system.  This research also showed that tax disputes between high–tax jurisdictions and corporate tax havens are extremely rare, and that tax disputes really only occur between high–tax jurisdictions.

Along with James R. Hines Jr. and Dhammika Dharmapala, Gabriel Zucman is noted as a leader in the study of tax havens, and his papers are amongst the most cited research on tax havens.  , Zucman ranks 1st out of "19,829 economists whose first publication of any kind is 10 or fewer years ago", on the IDEAS/RePEc St Louis Reserve database of papers by global economists.

Much of Zucman's other research deals with the effect of the G20's crackdown on tax havens and corporate tax havens, cross–border taxation and multinational profit shifting, the long–term relationship between wealth and inheritance, and the trajectory of wealth inequality in the United States. Zucman is frequently quoted in the leading global news media.

Tørsløv-Wier-Zucman 2018 list 

The only tax havens from the Tørsløv-Wier-Zucman list that have ever appeared on an OECD list of tax havens,  are some Caribbean locations, namely The British Virgin Islands (but not the Cayman Islands).  Nine of the top ten locations from the Tørsløv-Wier-Zucman list, match the top ten on the James R. Hines 2010 list (assuming that Zucman's "Caribbean" is mostly two locations, The Cayman Islands and The British Virgin Islands; Zucman lists Bermuda separately).

 
(*) Identified as one of the largest 10 tax havens by James R. Hines Jr. in 2010 (the Hines 2010 List).
(†) Identified as one of the 5 Conduits (Ireland, Singapore, Switzerland, the Netherlands, and the United Kingdom), by CORPNET in 2017.
(‡) Identified as one of the largest 5 Sinks (British Virgin Islands, Luxemburg, Hong Kong, Jersey, Bermuda), by CORPNET in 2017.
(Δ) Identified on the first, and the largest, OECD 2000 list of 35 tax havens (the OECD list only contained Trinidad & Tobago by 2017); only some Caribbean territories were listed by the OECD in 2000.

Personal

Zucman is married to the French economist Claire Montialoux, whom he met in 2006.

In May 2020, Zucman criticized White House Advisor Kevin Hassett's usage of the term "human capital stock", claiming it "only makes sense in the context of slave societies". Twitter users discovered that Zucman himself used the term in his own academic work, which has since been revised.

Bibliography

See also

Conduit and Sink OFCs
Corporate tax havens
Ireland as a tax haven
Tax havens
Base erosion and profit shifting
Double Irish, Single Malt, and CAIA, BEPS tools
James R. Hines Jr.

References

External links
 
 Gabriel Zucman's website
 The World Inequality Database
 
 The Wealth Detective Who Finds the Hidden Money of the Super Rich, Bloomberg News (23 May 2019)

1986 births
French economists
Living people
Writers from Paris
Goldman School of Public Policy faculty
University of California, Berkeley College of Letters and Science faculty
Social scientists